Flex or FLEX may refer to:

Computing
 Flex (language), developed by Alan Kay
 FLEX (operating system), a single-tasking operating system for the Motorola 6800
 FlexOS, an operating system developed by Digital Research
 FLEX (protocol), a communication protocol for pagers
 Flex, a family of automatic test equipment produced by Teradyne
 FLEx, a piece of software used in language documentation
 Apache Flex, formerly Adobe Flex, technologies for developing rich internet applications
 Flex (lexical analyser generator), a lexical analyser generator and a free software alternative to lex
 Flex machine, a computer developed by RSRE in the 1980s
 CSS Flexible Box Layout, commonly known as Flexbox, a CSS 3 web layout model

Science and technology
 Bending, also known as flexure, as used in mechanics
 Flexion, in anatomy, a position made possible by the joint angle decreasing
 Femtosecond Lenticule EXtraction, a form of refractive eye surgery
 Flex circuit, a flexible printed circuit used in electronic assemblies
 FLEX mission, a future satellite launch mission by the European Space Agency
 Flex temp, a reduced takeoff thrust setting which trades excess performance for reduced engine wear
 Flex-fuel, a flexible-fuel vehicle
 Inflection point, of a curve in geometry
 Power cord, or flex, a flexible electrical cable

Music
 Flex (album), Lene Lovich's 1979 second album
 Flex (EP) a 2003 EP by Pitch Black
 "Flex" (Dizzee Rascal song), 2007
 "Flex" (Mad Cobra song), 1992
 "Flex" (Polo G song), 2020
 "Flex (Ooh, Ooh, Ooh)", a 2015 song by Rich Homie Quan
 Flex, a break in the recitation tone before the mediation in Gregorian chant
A "flex" in a "flex bar", a technique used in battle rap.

Organizations
 Flex (club), a nightclub in Vienna, Austria
 Flex (company) (NASDAQ symbol: FLEX), a contract electronics maker based in Singapore
 Flex FM, a London-based radio station
 Flex-Elektrowerkzeuge, a German producer of power tools
 Flex Linhas Aéreas, a Brazilian regional airline

People
 Flex (singer), Félix Danilo Gómez (born 1974), Panamanian singer
 Flex Alexander, Mark Alexander Knox (b. 1970), an American actor and comedian
 Funkmaster Flex, Aston George Taylor Jr (b. 1968), an American hip hop DJ
 Walter Flex (1887–1917), German author

Other uses
 Amazon Flex, a platform for gig workers performing deliveries for Amazon
 Flex (comics), a fictional superhero
 Flex (film), a commercial/short film by English director Chris Cunningham
 Flex (magazine), an American bodybuilding magazine
 Flex (TV program), a 2021 Philippine variety show
 Fleet Landing Exercises, a series of landing exercises conducted by the Fleet Marine Force, a combined-United States Navy/Marine landing force
 Flex Your Rights, a civil-liberties non-profit based in Washington DC, US
 Ford Flex, a crossover SUV produced from 2009-2019
 Future Leaders Exchange, an American student exchange program for high school students from the former Soviet Union

See also
 Bend (disambiguation)
 Flexible (disambiguation)